The Wittsburg Store and Gas Station is a historic retail establishment on Cross County Road 637 in Wittsburg, Arkansas.  It is the only commercial building in the community.  Built c. 1930, it is a single-story wood-frame structure with a gable roof and a false front.   A shed-roof porch extends across the front, supported by for square posts.  The main entrance is centered, flanked by sash windows.  A gable-roofed section extends from the rear of the building, providing residential space for the shop, which occupies the main block.  The building also features a concrete storm cellar, and there is a period gas pump to the building's southeast.  The store operated from the 1930s to the 1980s, and is a reminder of Wittsburg's former status as a significant river town.

The store was listed on the National Register of Historic Places in 2000.

See also
National Register of Historic Places listings in Cross County, Arkansas

References

Commercial buildings on the National Register of Historic Places in Arkansas
Buildings and structures completed in 1930
Buildings and structures in Cross County, Arkansas
National Register of Historic Places in Cross County, Arkansas
Gas stations on the National Register of Historic Places in Arkansas